Dominik Bergdorf (born 3 February 1993) is a German footballer who plays as a goalkeeper for FC Denzlingen. He played for the youth teams of SC Lauchringen, Grasshopper Club Zürich, and SC Freiburg and 2011 and 2012, he won the DFB Youth Cup with the Freiburg's U19.

Career
Bergdorf made his professional debut for Regensburg on 9 August 2014 in a 3. Liga match against Borussia Dortmund II. Regensburg lost the match 5–1.

References

External links
 

1993 births
Living people
Association football goalkeepers
German footballers
SSV Jahn Regensburg players
Sportfreunde Lotte players
Offenburger FV players
3. Liga players